Fabio Concato (born Fabio Piccaluga, 31 May 1953 in Milan) is an Italian singer-songwriter.

Life and career 
Born Fabio Piccaluga in Milan, the son of a jazz musician and a poet, Concato started his career with the cabaret group "I mormoranti", performing at the Derby Club in his hometown. He debuted as a singer-songwriter with the album Storie di sempre, which included a minor hit in the form of A Dean Martin. Concato's popularity received a big boost in 1982 with the song Una domenica bestiale, which became a major hit in the Italian charts. 
Other popular songs by Concato include Fiore di maggio, Speriamo che piova, Ti ricordo ancora and 051/222525. Concato entered the Sanremo Music Festival twice, in 2001 with Ciao ninìn and in 2007 with Oltre il giardino.

Discography 

 Album    
     1977: Storie di sempre (Harmony, LPH 8017)
     1978: Svendita totale (Harmony, LPH 8030)
     1979: Zio Tom (Philips, 6223 088)
     1982: Fabio Concato (Philips, 6492 131)
     1984: Fabio Concato (Philips, 822 079-1)
     1986: Senza avvisare (Philips, 830 037-1)
     1990: Giannutri (Philips, 842 945-1)
     1992: In viaggio (Mercury Records, 512 901-1)
     1996: Blu (Mercury Records, 532 923-2)
     1999: Fabio Concato (Mercury Records, 538 857-2)
     2001: Ballando con Chet Baker (Mercury Records, 548 628-2)
     2012: Tutto qua (Halidon, HALP08)

References

External links 
 
 Fabio Concato at Discogs

1953 births
Italian pop singers
Italian male composers
Italian  male singer-songwriters
Living people
20th-century Italian male  singers
20th-century Italian composers
21st-century Italian  male singers
21st-century Italian composers
Singers from Milan